Pyotr Drozhdin (1745–1805) was a Russian painter.  He studied in St. Petersburg under Alexei Antropov and Dmitri Levitsky, and was granted the title of Academician in 1785.

References

 

18th-century painters from the Russian Empire
Russian male painters
19th-century painters from the Russian Empire
1745 births
1805 deaths
19th-century male artists from the Russian Empire